The Bunyoro rabbit  or Central African rabbit (Poelagus marjorita) is a species of mammal in the family Leporidae. It is monotypic within the genus Poelagus. It is found in central Africa and its typical habitat is damp savannah, often with rocky outcrops.

Description
Both the hind legs and ears are shorter than in other African species, and the coat is coarser. The general body colour is greyish-brown and the tail is yellowish above and white beneath.

Distribution and habitat
The Bunyoro rabbit is native to Central Africa. Its range extends from southern Chad and South Sudan to northeastern Democratic Republic of the Congo and western Kenya as far south as the northern end of Lake Tanganyika. There is a separate population in Angola. Its favoured habitat is damp savannah, often with rocky outcrops. It also occurs in woodland where Isoberlinia spp. trees grow and sometimes in forests. It is often associated with rock hyrax and may use the same crevices among rocks in which to hide, and in the Rift Valley it occupies the same type of habitat as rockhares (Pronolagus spp.) do in southern Africa.

Behaviour
The Bunyoro rabbit is nocturnal, hiding during the day in a form in dense vegetation or a hole among rocks and coming out to feed as part of a family group at night. Its diet consists of grasses and flowering plants and it likes the succulent young shoots that sprout from the ground after land has been cleared or burned. When living in proximity to cultivated land, it feeds on rice and peanut plants. Predators that feed on the Bunyoro rabbit probably include hawks, owls, servals (Felis serval), cape genets (Genetta tigrina) and servaline genets (Genetta servalina).

Breeding seems to occur at any time of year. The gestation period is about five weeks and one or two altricial young are born in a breeding hole, the entrance of which is loosely blocked with soil or grass.

Status
The population trend of the Bunyoro rabbit is believed to be stable and it is common in some parts of its range. No particular threats have been identified although the animal is hunted locally, and for these reasons the IUCN, in its Red List of Endangered Species, lists it as being of "Least Concern".

References

Mammals described in 1929
Mammals of Angola
Mammals of Chad
Mammals of Kenya
Mammals of South Sudan
Mammals of the Democratic Republic of the Congo
Leporidae
Taxonomy articles created by Polbot